Edmund Trafford may refer to:

Edmund Trafford (1526–1590), MP for Lancashire
Edmund Trafford (died 1620), MP for Newton